Brian D. Smedley is known for his work on health equity. He is the co-founder and executive director of the National Collaborative for Health Equity. He was formerly the vice president and director of the Joint Center for Political and Economic Studies' Health Policy Institute from 2008 to 2014. Before that, he was the co-founder and research director of the communications, research, and policy organization the Opportunity Agenda. He has also been a senior program officer at the Division of Health Sciences Policy of the Institute of Medicine, and the Director for Public Interest Policy at the American Psychological Association.

References

21st-century African-American people
African-American academics
21st-century American psychologists
American medical researchers
Harvard University alumni
Living people
University of California, Los Angeles alumni
Year of birth missing (living people)